The Battle of Bolia, was a battle in 469 between the Ostrogoths (Amal Goths) and a coalition of Germanic tribes in the Roman province of Pannonia.  It was fought on the south side of the Danube near its confluence with the river Bolia, in present-day Hungary.  The Ostrogoths won, achieving supremacy in Pannonia, but soon migrated south towards richer lands.

Background
Following the death of Attila, various Germanic and other tribes sought their independence from his empire. They allied under the command of Ardaric, the Gepid king, and defeated the Huns and supporting forces at the Battle of Nedao in 454 CE. While the role of the Ostrogoths in that battle is unclear, it resulted in their independence as well. After the Battle of Nedao, the newly freed tribes jockeyed for supremacy in Pannonia for the next fifteen years, most eventually becoming federates of the Eastern Roman Empire.

Battle
The Amal Goths were led by Theodemir, brother-in-law to the Ostrogoths' chief Valamir, who had been killed prior to the battle. The coalition included the Suevi under Hunimund, the Sciri under Hunulphus and Edicon (Edeko, Edica, Edika), the Sarmatians, the Gepids, the Rugians, and likely included the Heruli. The Roman Emperor Leo I supported the anti-Goth coalition, despite the advice of his general Aspar. Despite Valamir's death, the Ostrogoths won, and the battle marked the end of the Sciri as a separate people.

Location
While some authors have simply stated that the Bolia River remains unidentified; nonetheless, in 1934 the historian Ludwig Schmidt attempted to identify the Bolia with the Ipeľ, and this identification continued to be followed by Wolfram, and several other modern authors, without further analysis. However, as Émilienne pointed out such an identification would not place the battle in Pannonia.

References

469
Bolia
Bolia
Bolia